The Cambridge Dictionary of Philosophy (1995; second edition 1999; third edition 2015) is a dictionary of philosophy published by Cambridge University Press and edited by the philosopher Robert Audi. There are 28 members on the Board of Editorial Advisors and 440 contributors.

Publication history
The Cambridge Dictionary of Philosophy was first published in 1995 by Cambridge University Press. A second edition followed in 1999, and a third edition in 2015.

References

Bibliography
Books

External links
 More information at the Cambridge University Press website

1995 non-fiction books
Books by Robert Audi
Cambridge University Press books
Dictionaries of philosophy
Encyclopedias of philosophy
English-language books